Selvam Karthi (born 1 September 2001) is an Indian field hockey player who plays as a forward. He was a member of the  India national team that played in the 2022 Asia Cup.

Early life 
Karthi hails from Ariyalur, a town in the Indian State of Tamil Nadu. His father Selvam works as a security guard at a government-run college. Karthi is the second of three children.

Karthi trained as a hockey player at the Sports Hostel for Excellence in Kovilpatti, which functioned under Sports Development Authority, the official sports organ of the government of Tamil Nadu. As of 2022, he was student at the SS Duraisamy Mariammal Arts College near Kovilpatti pursuing his graduation.

Career 
In 2018, Karthi was included in the India national under-21 team after a series of good performances for Tamil Nadu in the Junior National Championships. In May 2022, he was named in India's squad for the Asia Cup. Alongside Mareeswaran Sakthivel, he was the first to be selected for the Indian national team from Tamil Nadu in 13 years. Karthi scored on debut in the opening match against Pakistan in the 9th minute. The match ended in a 1–1 draw. India finished third defeating Japan 1–0.

References

External links 
 Selvam Karthi profile at Hockey India

2001 births
Living people
People from Ariyalur district
Indian male field hockey players
Field hockey players from Tamil Nadu
Male field hockey forwards